No Prima Donna: The Songs of Van Morrison released in October 1994 is the first tribute album for the songs of singer-songwriter Van Morrison.  The album was produced by Van Morrison and his friend for many years, Phil Coulter.  Morrison's longtime girlfriend, Michelle Rocca was the model on the cover of the album.   Morrison was actively involved in choosing the songs and the artists who performed them, which is unusual for most tribute albums.

Track listing
All songs by Van Morrison

"You Make Me Feel So Free"  performed by Sinéad O'Connor – 4:46
"Queen of the Slipstream" performed by Brian Kennedy – 4:43
"Coney Island" performed by Liam Neeson – 2:23
"Crazy Love" performed by Cassandra Wilson – 3:11
"Bright Side of the Road" performed by Hothouse Flowers – 5:04
"Irish Heartbeat"  performed by Brian Kennedy, and Shana Morrison – 4:56
"Full Force Gale" performed by Elvis Costello – 3:01
"Tupelo Honey" performed by Phil Coulter Orchestra – 3:26
"Madame George"  performed by Marianne Faithfull – 4:47
"Friday's Child" performed by Lisa Stansfield – 3:47

Personnel
On all tracks
Ivan Gilliland – guitar
Foggy Lyttle – guitar
Nicky Scott – bass
Phil Coulter – keyboards, piano 
Liam Bradley – drums
Carl Geraghty – saxophone

External links
Randy Krbechek's Metronews – Music Reviews

1994 compilation albums
Van Morrison tribute albums
Albums produced by Van Morrison
Polydor Records compilation albums